is a railway station in Kamigōri, Akō District, Hyōgo Prefecture, Japan, operated by the third-sector semi-public railway operator Chizu Express.

Lines
Kokenawa Station is served by the Chizu Express Chizu Line.

Adjacent stations

|-
!colspan=5|Chizu Express

See also
 List of railway stations in Japan

External links

Railway stations in Hyōgo Prefecture